Juan García (died 31 December 1601) was a Roman Catholic prelate who served as Bishop of Almería (1597–1601).

Biography
On 17 August 1597, Juan García was selected by the King of Spain and confirmed by Pope Clement VIII as Bishop of Almería. He served as Bishop of Almería until his death on 31 December 1601.

References 

1601 deaths
16th-century Roman Catholic bishops in Spain
Bishops appointed by Pope Clement VIII